Jens Martin Knudsen (born 11 June 1967) is a former Faroese footballer who played as a goalkeeper and a businessman. 
He was perhaps best known for wearing a hat in his matches as a result of an injury he suffered at age 14. He later become known as "the bobble hat goalkeeper".

Club career
Knudsen started his career as an amateur footballer for local team NSÍ Runavík. In 1992, he moved to GÍ Gøta to win a Faroese championship medal four times in a row between 1993 and 1996. After two seasons in Iceland with Leiftur he returned to the Faroe Islands and spent a short time on loan at Scottish team Ayr United before moving back to Leiftur for one more season. In 2001, he finally returned to his NSÍ again to become player/manager. He retired from playing football at the age of 40.

International career
He is famous for his 65 appearances for the Faroe Islands national football team, and his penchant for wearing a white, wooly bobble hat. Knudsen made his debut in an August 1988 friendly match against Iceland, the country's first FIFA-recognized match.

The Faroe Islands pulled off one of the most famous upsets in football history in their first official competitive match, by beating then World Cup 1990 competitors Austria 1–0 in a UEFA 92 qualifier. Knudsen was one of the heroes on that night, pulling off a massive string of saves and becoming a cult hero in the process. At the time he was a part-time forklift truck driver from the Runavik fish factory. Also, due to the aforementioned hat, in international football journalism he earned the nickname "The Keeper with the Bobble Hat."

On the BBC TV series Fantasy Football League in 1996, he appeared with presenters Frank Skinner and David Baddiel on the shows famous segment Phoenix From The Flames to re-create the famous moment. David and Frank played the part of the Austrian strikers and Jens played the part of himself, saving their shots exactly the same as in the actual match with the real footage played after. A running gag seen in the sketch, was two people dressed as Egyptian pharaohs, getting confused thinking the islands are near there hence the name, only to be told by Frank Skinner "You've got it all wrong, the Faroe Islands are near Iceland", only to receive a reply in a stereotypical Egyptian accent of "Oh you mean the freezer place on the high street!". Jens is later seen standing outside an outlet of the store holding up a piece of card reading "FAROE ISLANDS".

He played his final international match on 14 May 2006 against Poland. He is the third most capped player for the Faroe Islands, with 65 caps to his name.

Personal life
Knudsen is married and has four children, including Petur Knudsen, who is also a Faroe Islands international footballer. Knudsen became national gymnastics champion and represented the Faroe Islands men's national handball team as an outfield player. He played for several seasons for the Faroese top flight handball club "Tjaldur".

Knudsen is a notable Faroese businessman and a co-owner of major Faroese saltfish selling company Vaðhorn.

References

External links

1967 births
Living people
Faroese footballers
Faroe Islands international footballers
Ayr United F.C. players
NSÍ Runavík players
Faroese expatriate sportspeople in Iceland
B36 Tórshavn players
Expatriate footballers in Iceland
Faroese expatriate footballers
GÍ Gøta players
Jens Martin Knudsen
Faroese male handball players
Association football goalkeepers
People from Saltangará
Frederikshavn fI players